Ana Cristina da Silva (born 12 December 1985), commonly known as Cris, is a Brazilian professional footballer who plays as a midfielder for Malabo Kings FC in the Equatoguinean Primera División Femenina.

Cris was part of the Equatorial Guinea women's national football team at the 2011 FIFA Women's World Cup.

On 5 October 2017, Cris and other nine Brazilian footballers were declared by FIFA as ineligible to play for Equatorial Guinea.

Early life
Ana Cristina da Silva was born on 12 December 1985 in Três Rios, a municipality of the state of Rio de Janeiro in Brazil.

Club career
While playing for Associação Ferroviária de Esportes (commonly known as Ferroviária) in Brazil, she was a member of the team that won the Campeonato Brasileiro de Futebol Feminino league and the Copa do Brasil de Futebol Feminino cup double in 2014.

International career
After being nationalised as an Equatoguinean, she was selected as a member of the Equatorial Guinea women's national football team for the 2011 FIFA Women's World Cup in Germany. At the time of being named in the squad, she was unattached at club level. When da Silva was a member of the Equatorial Guinea team that won the 2012 African Women's Championship, she was one of 11 out of the 21 players who were naturalized Brazilians playing as Equatoguineans.

She continued to play for the Equatoguinean women's team through the qualifying matches for the 2016 Summer Olympics in Rio de Janeiro, Brazil. However, the team were expelled from the tournament after fielding a player with fraudulent documentation.

International goals
Scores and results list Equatorial Guinea's goal tally first

Notes

References

1985 births
Living people
Sportspeople from Rio de Janeiro (state)
Brazilian women's footballers
Women's association football midfielders
Santos FC (women) players
Associação Ferroviária de Esportes (women) players
São Paulo FC (women) players
Campeonato Brasileiro de Futebol Feminino Série A1 players

Equatorial Guinea women's international footballers
2011 FIFA Women's World Cup players

Brazilian expatriate women's footballers
Brazilian expatriate sportspeople in Equatorial Guinea
Expatriate women's footballers in Equatorial Guinea
People from Três Rios